William Colbeck may refer to:
 William Colbeck (gangster) (1890–1943), St. Louis politician and organized crime figure
 William Colbeck (seaman) (1871–1930), British seaman who distinguished himself on two Antarctic expeditions
William Henry Colbeck (1823–1901), Member of Parliament in New Zealand